Rheubarbariboletus persicolor is a species of bolete fungus. It was originally described in 1996 as Xerocomus persicolor, based on collections made in Italy. The bolete was found in mixed woodland with hop-hornbeam, pine, and oak.

References

External links

Boletaceae
Fungi of Europe
Fungi described in 1996